The Irksone eel (Gordiichthys ergodes) is an eel in the family Ophichthidae (worm/snake eels). It was described by John E. McCosker, Eugenia Brandt Böhlke, and James Erwin Böhlke in 1989. It is a marine, temperate water-dwelling eel which is known from a single specimen discovered in the northeastern Gulf of Mexico, in the western central Atlantic Ocean.

References

Ophichthidae
Fish described in 1989